A statue of Christopher Columbus was installed in Norwalk, Connecticut, United States.

History
The statue was dedicated and installed at the city's Columbus Magnet School on Columbus Day, October 12, 1940. It was relocated to the city's Heritage Wall in 1983.

The memorial was removed by order of the city in June 2020. The city hired contractors to remove the statue at night, in order to preempt possible conflict between supporters of the statue and those calling for its removal.

See also

 List of monuments and memorials removed during the George Floyd protests

References

Buildings and structures in Norwalk, Connecticut
Monuments and memorials in Connecticut
Monuments and memorials removed during the George Floyd protests
Outdoor sculptures in Connecticut
Sculptures of men in Connecticut
Statues in Connecticut
Norwalk, Connecticut
Statues removed in 2020